is a Japanese surname. 

Ekizo Fujibayashi (1907-2007), Japanese chief justice
Hidemaro Fujibayashi, a Japanese game designer
Sheena Fujibayashi from Tales of Symphonia.
Suzu Fujibayashi, a character from Tales of Phantasia.
Kyou and Ryou Fujibayashi from Clannad.
Shoko Fujibayashi, a lyricist

Japanese-language surnames